Eric Orlando Young Sr. (born May 18, 1967) is an American former professional baseball second baseman and left fielder, who played in Major League Baseball (MLB) for the Los Angeles Dodgers, Colorado Rockies, Chicago Cubs, Milwaukee Brewers, San Francisco Giants, Texas Rangers, and San Diego Padres. He has served as the first base coach for the Braves since 2018. He played college baseball and college football for Rutgers University.

Raised in New Brunswick, New Jersey, Young attended New Brunswick High School, where he played basketball and football, in addition to baseball.

Baseball career

1990s
Young began his MLB career with the Los Angeles Dodgers in 1992, but soon became one of the original Colorado Rockies in 1993. He hit a home run in the Rockies' first-ever home at bat on April 9, 1993, as part of an 11-4 home win over the Montreal Expos. He helped Colorado to its first postseason series appearance in 1995, which they lost to the Atlanta Braves, three games to one. His best seasons came with the Rockies, where he was an All-Star and a Silver Slugger Award winner in 1996 at second base. In 1996, he hit .324, with 8 home runs, 74 RBI and 53 stolen bases.

During the 1990s, Young was one of the top base stealers in the major leagues. He is the Rockies career leader in stolen bases and is in the top 10 in many other offensive categories. On June 30, 1996, he managed to steal second base, third base, and home plate in one inning in a game against the Los Angeles Dodgers. In 1997, fan favorite Young was traded back to Los Angeles for pitcher Pedro Astacio. While in Los Angeles during 1998–1999, Young continued his consistency by stealing bases and hitting for solid averages.

2000s
Young was traded by the Dodgers to the Chicago Cubs in 1999. In 2000, while a member of the Cubs, he hit .297, with 6 home runs, 98 runs and 54 steals. In 2001, he enjoyed a similar season. In January 2002, Young signed as a free agent with the Milwaukee Brewers. In 2003, he hit 15 home runs, a career-high that almost doubled his previous best of 8 home runs. Young went on to play with the Texas Rangers and the San Diego Padres, where he was mainly used as a pinch runner. On August 1, 2006, Young was released by the Padres. He was subsequently reacquired by the Rangers and joined the team later that month. In late October, he declared free agency, but did not end up playing in the Majors again. Young officially retired as a member of the Colorado Rockies on September 12, 2008.  He was honored during a pregame ceremony that same day at Coors Field before the Rockies took on the Los Angeles Dodgers.

Post-playing career
Young's son, Eric Young Jr., has also played professional baseball. Eric Jr. graduated from Piscataway Township High School in 2003 and on August 25, 2009, made his major league debut with the Colorado Rockies when Dexter Fowler was put on the disabled list. Young Jr. currently serves as first base coach for the Washington Nationals, following his father’s footsteps, who coaches first base for the Atlanta Braves.

Young was also an analyst on the sports program Baseball Tonight. He is often mentioned in the term "Souvenir City Chamber of Commerce, Eric Young President" which is the term used by host Steve Berthiaume when showing a home run. He also calls out "Souvenir City!" when showing footage of a home run.

Young served as a running instructor for the Houston Astros and helped with their outfield and base running. He was named the Arizona Diamondbacks first base coach on October 17, 2010. On October 17, 2012, Young was fired from the position. He joined the Rockies as the first base coach for the 2014 season. He was fired after the 2016 season. He was hired to be the first base coach of the Atlanta Braves for the 2018 season. Young opted out of traveling with the Braves during the 2020 season, due to the COVID-19 pandemic.

Personal life
As a high school student, Young welcomed his oldest son and namesake, Eric Young Jr., with high-school sweetheart Paula Robinson. Eric Jr. followed him into professional baseball. On December 10, 2005, he married Beyonka Jackson and they welcomed their son Dallas Dupree Young, who is an actor.

See also

 List of Colorado Rockies team records
List of Major League Baseball annual stolen base leaders
List of Major League Baseball annual triples leaders
List of Major League Baseball career stolen bases leaders

References

External links

1967 births
Living people
African-American baseball coaches
African-American baseball players
Arizona Diamondbacks coaches
Albuquerque Dukes players
Atlanta Braves coaches
Baseball coaches from New Jersey
Baseball players from New Jersey
Chicago Cubs players
Colorado Rockies (baseball) coaches
Colorado Rockies players
Colorado Springs Sky Sox players
Gulf Coast Dodgers players
Los Angeles Dodgers players
Major League Baseball first base coaches
Major League Baseball second basemen
Milwaukee Brewers players
National League stolen base champions
New Brunswick High School alumni
New Haven Ravens players
Oklahoma RedHawks players
Portland Beavers players
Rutgers Scarlet Knights baseball players
Rutgers Scarlet Knights football players
Salem Avalanche players
San Antonio Missions players
San Bernardino Stampede players
San Diego Padres players
San Francisco Giants players
Silver Slugger Award winners
Sportspeople from New Brunswick, New Jersey
Texas Rangers players
Vero Beach Dodgers players
21st-century African-American people
20th-century African-American sportspeople
American expatriate baseball people in Venezuela